Leutnant Hans Imelmann (14 May 1897 – 23 January 1917) was a World War I flying ace credited with six aerial victories. As a founding member of one of Germany's original fighter squadrons, he was shot down and killed before he reached his twentieth birthday.

Biography
Hans Imelmann was born in Hannover, the German Empire, on 14 May 1897.

His first known military service was as a Fokker Eindekker pilot for one of the early ad hoc fighter units, Kampfeinsitzerkommando (Combat Single-Seater Command) Metz, in 1916. He was selected by Oswald Boelcke as a pilot for Germany's new fighter squadron, Royal Prussian Jagdstaffel 2, upon its formation. Between 10 October and 20 December 1916, he was credited with six confirmed victories. Imelmann's third victory set Nieuport 17 no. A162 from No. 60 Squadron RFC aflame, but its pilot, British ace Ernest Foot somehow escaped its crash-landing uninjured.

On 23 January 1917, Imelmann became one of the first aces killed in action. Imelmann attacked a Royal Aircraft Factory BE.2c belonging to No. 4 Squadron RFC near Miraumont, France. A burst of machine gun fire through his fuel tank sent Imelmann down in flames.

Endnotes

References
 Franks, Norman; Bailey, Frank W.; Guest, Russell. Above the Lines: The Aces and Fighter Units of the German Air Service, Naval Air Service and Flanders Marine Corps, 1914–1918. Grub Street, 1993. , .
 Shores, Christopher; Franks, Norman; Guest, Russell. Above the Trenches: A Complete Record of the Fighter Aces and Units of the British Empire Air Forces 1915–1920.  Grub Street, 1990. , .

1897 births
1917 deaths
Aviators killed by being shot down
German World War I flying aces
German military personnel killed in World War I
Luftstreitkräfte personnel
Military personnel from Hanover
People from the Province of Hanover